Giff or GIFF may refer to:

 Giff, a monster in Advanced Dungeons & Dragons 2nd edition
 Gasparilla International Film Festival (GIFF), a film festival in Tampa Bay, Florida
 Guwahati International Film Festival (GIFF), an annual film festival held in Guwahati, Assam, India

See also
 GIF (disambiguation)